Lithuania will compete at the 2022 European Championships in Munich from August 11 to August 22, 2022.

Medallists

Competitors
The following is the list of number of competitors in the Championships:

Athletics

Beach Volleyball

Lithuania has qualified 2 female pairs.

Canoeing

Cycling

Track Cycling 

Sprint

Team sprint

Qualification legend: FA=Gold medal final; FB=Bronze medal final

Keirin

Omnium

Individual events

Road Cycling

MTB Cycling

Gymnastics

Lithuania has entered five male and one female athletes.

Men

Qualification

Women

Qualification

Rowing

Sport climbing

Table tennis 

Singles

Doubles

Triathlon

References

2022
Nations at the 2022 European Championships
European Championships